The oyasato-yakata (おやさとやかた) complex is a collection of buildings in Tenri City, Nara, Japan, that form an incomplete square  on each side surrounding the Divine Residence (Oyasato), a structure sacred to the Japanese new religion Tenrikyo. The task of revitalizing the area around the Residence was informed by both religious prophecy and city planning, and construction began in 1954 on a project that continues today. The oyasato-yakata is a massive organizational undertaking that is understood by Tenrikyo adherents as a spiritual practice, creating a model city that reflects their belief in a Joyous Life. As such a practice it has involved the entire Tenrikyo community, from the volunteers who assist in construction to professors who plan the scope of future wings. Archaeologists have also excavated ancient artifacts beneath its foundations.

The complex includes Tenri University, Tenri Hospital, Tenri Seminary, the Besseki Lecture Hall, the Shuyoka, dormitories, and Tenri High School. Currently 25 wings of the complex are complete. The complete structure calls for 68 wings.

Origins
At the beginning of the 20th century, the teachings of Tenrikyo's foundress Oyasama Miki became popular throughout Japan. In the following decades, the most devoted followers coalesced around Oyasama's residence in rural Nara, which she had perceived as the birthplace of the world, or Jiba. The six villages surrounding the Jiba slowly became filled with Tenrikyo ministers, mystics, and evangelists, and the area was urbanized. A popular international school (now Tenri University) and Tenri Central Library, built by followers, were also attracting a variety of people to the area. It was around this time that Tenrikyo's Second Shinbashira (community leader) Shōzen Nakayama conceived of creating a grand construction project as a testament to the loyalty of Oyasama's followers.

In 1934, Nakayama commissioned the famed architect Yoshikazu Uchida to draw up a blueprint for the area. Uchida arranged ten buildings around Oyasama's Residence. A 50-meter boulevard would come out of the Residence on a north–south axis, along which six school buildings would be lined up. Classrooms and large auditoriums would be built at the end of this boulevard. The international school and library were to be eventually integrated into this plan. In January 1937, a middle school (now Tenri High School) was built according to Uchida's plan, but as Japan mobilized for the Pacific War the plan had to be temporarily shelved.

In 1952, after the war and Occupation, Tenrikyo Chief of Architecture Onzō Okumura (奥村音造) was asked by Nakayama to design a large Besseki Lecture Hall to accommodate 10,000 people on the site of an old girls' school. However, considering the location of the school, several hundred meters to the west of the Residence. Okumura thought back to an old prophecy of Oyasama, as recorded in Tenrikyo's Anecdotes:

Since Tenrikyo was at the time a tiny cult centered on a house in a farming village, the growth of Tenri into a city full of inns paralleling this prophecy was seen as miraculous. In the Osashizu these prophecies are repeated, with the admonition that "it will not do to think of small things." The original idea was that the planned school buildings and classrooms would be the first part of an enormous central hub that would eventually fill eight cho square. But Okumura began to consider the relationships between the planned buildings and the Residence. If other buildings were placed directly next to the Residence, he reasoned, they would put the Residence in shadow during the sunrise, and metaphorically crowd out the importance of the Jiba itself. Thus, with Nakayama's permission, he developed a new overarching plan for the school, library, and other Tenrikyo buildings surrounding the Residence. His new plan, which arranged the buildings in a great square with open space on the inside, was dubbed the oyasato-yakata, roughly meaning the "grounds of Oyasama's Residence".

In 1954 the Japanese government merged the six villages surrounding the Residence into a single city, which was dubbed Tenri City. In the same year, the Tenrikyo central church announced the construction of the first wing of the yakata. The continuing development of the oyasato-yakata is currently overseen by a committee with a small office in Tenri Seminary.

Construction

The yakata was designed along the lines of Edo period tenement housing (長屋), but modernized with reinforced walls, multiple stories, and balconies for emergency access. The result is a fusion between Western and Japanese architecture. Gaps were purposefully left in the ground floors for pedestrians, making the yakata a walkable space. The balconies and rooftops were also designed to please the eye at the ground level. At the same time, the roofs are visible from Oyasama's gravesite north of the city.

As construction began, Tenrikyo followers founded the Oyasato Construction Young Men's Association Hinokishin Corps, which volunteered time and labor to help build the yakata. The corps still continues their work today. By 1956, one corner of the complex had been built at the cost of 23 billion yen, an enormous expense given the economic depression of the time.

When part of the foundations for the complex were dug in 1977, an archaeological investigation uncovered prehistoric cum, as is typical during construction in Tenri. Although it was a sparsely inhabited village in Oyasama's time, Tenri City lies on top of a confirmed cultural center of prehistoric Japan.

Timeline of construction

Influence on the city

Information theorist Nomura Masaichi, noting Tenrikyo's description of the oyasato-yakata as a realization of the prophecy of Oyasama and the Tenrikyo saying that "in the construction of form lies the construction of hearts", refers to the ongoing construction as a "medium that combats decontextualization", claiming that it gives renewed relevance to the teachings and introduces a physical context by giving them an active role in shaping the city, and that in time, the thoughts of Tenrikyo believers will come to embody the grand scale of the architecture.

One Tenrikyo elder has written the following on the subject:

Taro Igarashi notes first and foremost its massive accomplishment in city planning. The ground-level architecture can be compared somewhat to Karl Marx-Hof, a massive tenement complex in Vienna, and the pilotis evoke Charles Fourier's phalanstère, an architectural form specifically designed to evoke and construct an egalitarian utopia. However, the use of Japanese roofs in a modern city is quite rare, and the sheer size of the yakata makes it perhaps a unique megastructure anywhere in the world. Commenting on Taro's article, the theologian Akio Inoue adds that the final interpretation, for the Tenrikyo believers who funded and built the structure, cannot be to inspire individual faith alone, but to "bridge the Joyous Life of the individual which determines the inner substance of faith and the world of the Joyous Life as an organized community".

References

Further reading
Igarashi Takayoshi, "City of the Joyous Life: Tenrikyo's Oyasato-Yakata." In Beautiful Cities and Wishes, Tokyo: Gakugei Shuppansha, 2006.
五十嵐敬喜　”陽気ぐらしの都市—天理教とおやさとやかた”　「美しい都市と祈り」　京都: 学芸出版社, 2006.4

Tenrikyo
Temples in Japan
Religious buildings and structures in Nara Prefecture
Buildings and structures in Nara Prefecture